Jaman South is a municipal area with 130 settlements, and a total population of 114,257. However, the voting population is a fraction of this. The current MP for this district is Yaw Afful of the New Patriotic Party.

History
Afful Yaw Maama was the member of parliament for the constituency in 2008. He was elected on the ticket of the New Patriotic Party (NPP) won a majority of 6,506 votes to become the MP. He succeeded Anna Nyamekye who had represented the constituency in the 4th Republic parliament also on the ticket of the New Patriotic Party (NPP).

Members of Parliament

See also
List of Ghana Parliament constituencies

References 

Parliamentary constituencies in the Bono Region